Always Be My Maybe is a 2019 American romantic comedy film, written by Ali Wong, Randall Park and Michael Golamco and directed by Nahnatchka Khan. It stars Park and Wong as childhood friends Marcus and Sasha, who have not been in touch since a brief teenage fling ended badly. When Sasha returns to San Francisco to open a restaurant and romantic chemistry from their teenager years remains, Marcus's fears and Sasha's fame and demanding career challenge their potential new relationship. James Saito, Michelle Buteau, Vivian Bang, Daniel Dae Kim and Keanu Reeves also star.

The film was released in select theaters on May 29, 2019, and digitally on May 31, 2019, on Netflix.

Plot

Sasha Tran and Marcus Kim are childhood friends who grow up next door to each other in San Francisco. As Sasha's Vietnamese-immigrant/refugee parents regularly leave her home alone while they tend to their store, Marcus's parents often have her over for dinner, and Marcus's Korean-American mother Judy teaches her to cook. 

Eventually Sasha and Marcus form a close friendship that carries on into their teenage years, but this is broken after his mother dies in an accident. Grieving, the two have sex but a wedge is driven between them when they argue shortly afterwards and they fall out of touch.

Sixteen years later, Sasha is a celebrity chef and engaged to Brandon Choi, a successful restaurateur. Marcus is still in San Francisco living with his widowed father and performs in a talented but largely unsuccessful band that only plays in his neighborhood. He also has a girlfriend Jenny, an Asian American woman with dreadlocks. Sasha breaks up with Brandon after he delays their wedding yet again. Briefly moving back to the Bay Area to oversee the opening of a new restaurant, she has a chance encounter with Marcus when he and his father are hired to install air conditioning at her temporary home.

After initial friction, they reconnect and become friends again, and Marcus admits to his father he still has feelings for Sasha. But before he can tell her, Sasha announces she has met someone new, and they wind up on a disastrous double date with Marcus' girlfriend and Sasha's new love interest: movie star Keanu Reeves. The long evening ultimately dissolves into chaos as Sasha confesses her longtime childhood crush on Marcus, a brawl breaks out between Marcus and Keanu, and Jenny ends up staying with Keanu for the night. Afterwards Marcus and Sasha have sex.

Sasha and Marcus then begin seeing each other, with Marcus reacquainting Sasha with the home and San Francisco Asian community she had distanced herself from, still harboring resentment of her absentee parents. He takes her to an old favorite Cantonese restaurant from their childhood, which Sasha remembers as terrible but discovers is delicious, marred only by her painful memories. 

As Sasha reconnects to the city and the two fall in love, Marcus is taken aback to learn that, as planned, she still intends to move on to New York for her next project, once the San Francisco restaurant has launched. When Sasha asks Marcus to join her, he refuses and she leaves San Francisco alone.

Taken to task by both his father and his bandmates, Marcus realizes that his mother's death has made him scared to move on in life. He then moves out of his childhood home and takes steps to make his band more successful. He calls Sasha regularly with updates but, not receiving any reply, does not pursue her further until he discovers she is secretly supporting his musical ambitions. This emboldens Marcus to surprise Sasha on the red carpet at an awards show in Manhattan, asking for her to take him back and pledging to be wherever she is. She accepts. Reunited, Sasha takes Marcus to the New York restaurant she has been developing: it is named for and features Judy's recipes.

Cast
 Ali Wong as Sasha Tran
 Miya Cech as 12 Year Old Sasha
 Ashley Liao as 14/16 Year Old Sasha
 Randall Park as Marcus Kim
 Emerson Min as 12 Year Old Marcus
 Jackson Geach as 14/16 Year Old Marcus
 James Saito as Harry Kim
 Michelle Buteau as Veronica
 Anaiyah Bernier as 16 Year Old Veronica
 Vivian Bang as Jenny
 Karan Soni as Tony
 Charlyne Yi as Ginger
 Susan Park as Judy Kim
 Daniel Dae Kim as Brandon Choi
 Keanu Reeves as himself
 Lyrics Born as Quasar
 Casey Wilson as Chloe
 Raymond Ma as Quoc Tran
 Peggy Lu as Sandy Tran
 Peter New as Goat Guy

Production

Development and casting

Ali Wong and Randall Park met in the late 1990s during a "fried-rice cooking competition hosted by a mutual friend from the LCC Theatre Company, an Asian American performance group Park co-founded while attending UCLA." Park and Wong stayed in touch and remained close friends and supportive of each other's projects.

In 2016, Wong mentioned in a New Yorker interview that she and Park had been working for years to develop "our version of When Harry Met Sally...". Vulture's Jackson McHenry wrote a column in enthusiastic support of the project with the headline, "Dear Hollywood, Please Make Ali Wong and Randall Park's Dream Rom-Com." The project picked up steam and in August 2017, Netflix announced it had green-lit an untitled film written by Wong, Park and Michael Golamco, with the former set to costar in the film. In March 2018, Nahnatchka Khan was announced as attached in her directorial debut, with principal photography to begin in Vancouver and San Francisco in May 2018. In May 2018, Keanu Reeves, Daniel Dae Kim, Michelle Buteau, Vivian Bang, Karan Soni, Charlyne Yi, James Saito, Lyrics Born, and Susan Park joined the cast of the film, titled Always Be My Maybe.

Reeves's casting was initially thought to be a pipe dream. "He's the dream guy," said Khan. "Like, we don't know what his schedule is, but this would be amazing." "We all thought it was going to be impossible to get him," said Park. "What was the likelihood of him being available, and then also him being willing to play himself? So let's try to think of other people that we could get." Alternatives to Reeves included Tony Leung, Mark Dacascos, M. Night Shyamalan and Paul Giamatti. Reeves, a big fan of Wong's stand-up, was on-board from the start and found a way to shoot his scene around his schedule. "He was like, 'I would be honored to be part of this love story,'" Khan said.

Reeves went over the script with Wong and Khan at the Chateau Marmont in Los Angeles. "He pitched a couple of things that made it in. Like wearing glasses that had no lens," Wong noted. "And the part in the game night scene where he lists all of these Chinese dignitaries, that was all his idea. And when he says, 'I don't have a problem, Sasha. What's your problem?' and starts air-fighting. It's hard to describe just how shockingly funny he is."

Filming 
Principal photography began on May 30, 2018, in Vancouver. Additional filming took place in San Francisco from July 15 to 26, 2018. Reeves, who was in the middle of filming John Wick: Chapter 3 – Parabellum, flew into the city specifically to shoot his two scenes before returning to New York.

Music 
Park's rap persona in the film is based on his earlier music career as a member of the 1990s Bay Area hip-hop group called Ill Again. The fictional band Hello Peril is a play on the term "yellow peril"—the "alleged threat to Western nations by East Asians". Rapper Lyrics Born appears as a band member. Park co-wrote several rap songs for the movie with hip-hop producer Dan the Automator. The song "I Punched Keanu Reeves" which plays in the end credits, was written by Park as "a tribute to Keanu, because he's such a big part of all our lives and because he actually agreed to be in our movie." Park had to get Reeves's permission for the song. "I sent him an email with some of the lyrics and asked if it would be OK, and he was totally down," Park said. "He even gave some suggestions."

The film's title is a play-on-words of the title of Mariah Carey's 1996 song "Always Be My Baby".

Release
Always Be My Maybe was released in select theaters on May 29, 2019, and on Netflix on May 31, 2019.

In July 2019, Netflix reported that the film was viewed by 32 million households in its first four weeks of release.

Reception

Critical response 
The site's critical consensus reads, "Carried by the infectious charms of Ali Wong and Randall Park, Always Be My Maybe takes familiar rom-com beats and cleverly layers in smart social commentary to find its own sweet groove." On Metacritic the film has a weighted average score of 64 out of 100, based on reviews from 20 critics, indicating "generally favorable reviews."

Courtney Howard of Variety wrote: "Perhaps the best sequences are multi-purpose. They’re both funny and genuine, add a bubbly buoyancy through deft wit and charm, and tweak genre conventions." Peter Travers of Rolling Stone called it "an irresistible romantic romp that turns the familiar into something sweet, sassy and laugh-out-loud funny."
Beandrea July of The Hollywood Reporter gave it a mixed review, and wrote: "In shouldering the weight of representing Asian love Always Be My Maybe doesn't quite allow its capable leads to do what has made them stars: just be themselves."

Accolades 
Always Be My Maybe was nominated at the 2019 People's Choice Awards for "The Comedy Movie Star of 2019 - Ali Wong". Randall Park and Dan the Automator were nominated in the category for "Best Original Song - I Punched Keanu Reeves" by the 2019 Houston Film Critics Society Awards, but won the award at the 2019 Chicago Indie Awards.

References

External links 
 
 

2019 films
2019 romantic comedy films
American romantic comedy films
Comedy films about Asian Americans
Asian-American romance films
Films about Korean Americans
Films about chefs
Films set in 1996
Films set in 1999
Films set in 2003
Films set in 2019
Films set in San Francisco
Films shot in San Francisco
Films shot in Vancouver
Films scored by Michael Andrews
Midlife crisis films
English-language Netflix original films
2010s English-language films
2010s American films